New York's 32nd congressional district was a congressional district for the United States House of Representatives in New York. It was eliminated as a result of the 1990 Census. It was last represented by John J. LaFalce who was redistricted into the 29th District.

Past components
New York's 32nd Congressional District was first formed in 1832. The district was abolished in 1862.

It was reestablished in 1872 and then consisted of Chautauqua County, New York and Cattaraugus County, New York. In 1874, the congressional districts of New York were redrawn and the 32nd district was moved to Erie County, the location of Buffalo, New York. With 178,699 residents it was the most populous district in New York, with its closest competitor being the 153,000 population of the 1st district on Long Island.

When district boundaries were again redrawn in 1885, the 32nd district was reduced to just covering Buffalo.

By 1892 even just Buffalo was too populous for a single district, and the city was split, with the southern portion being put in the 32nd district.

In the 1902 redistricting the 32nd district was moved to Monroe County, which is dominated by the city of Rochester.

1913–1945:
All of Jefferson, Lewis, Madison, Oswego
1945–1953:
All of Albany
Parts of Rensselaer
1953–1963:
All of Fulton, Hamilton, Montgomery, Otsego, Schenectady
1963–1971:
All of Herkimer, Madison, Oneida
1971–1973:
All of Fulton, Hamilton, Herkimer, Lewis, Oneida
1973–1983:
All of Chenango, Cortland, Madison
Parts of Delaware, Onondaga, Otsego
1983–1993: 
All of Niagara, Orleans
Parts of Erie, Monroe

List of members representing the district

Election results
The following chart shows historic election results. Bold type indicates victor. Italic type indicates incumbent.

References 

 Congressional Biographical Directory of the United States 1774–present
 Election Statistics 1920–present Clerk of the House of Representatives

31
Former congressional districts of the United States
Constituencies established in 1833
Constituencies disestablished in 1863
1833 establishments in New York (state)
1863 disestablishments in New York (state)
Constituencies established in 1873
Constituencies disestablished in 1993
1873 establishments in New York (state)
1993 disestablishments in New York (state)